Giga Pix is a non-profit Portuguese Internet exchange point established in October 1995 (known only as Pix at that time), managed and operated by FCT|FCCN.

This is a neutral Internet Exchange Point where traffic is switched at high speeds between connected organizations, improving the quality of IP interconnections in Portugal and preventing the usage of international transit links for traffic with local scope.

Physically, Giga Pix has four Exchange Points in two different cities, three in Lisbon and another in Porto, improving even further the connectivity among Portuguese local networks.

References

 
Routing